Baye Ibrahima Niasse (born 18 April 1988) is a Senegalese professional footballer who plays as a midfielder for Greek Gamma Ethniki club Kozani.

Club career
Niasse was born in Dakar, Senegal.

He played 64 league games for Neuchâtel Xamax in Switzerland.

On 5 June 2013, Niasse signed a one-year contract with Gabala, moving from fellow Azerbaijan Premier League Inter Baku. Niasse made his debut for Gabala in their 2–1 away victory over FK Baku on 2 August 2013. His first goal for the club was the third goal in a 3–2 victory over Inter Baku in his second game for the club.

After leaving Gabala at the end of his one-year contract, Niasse went on trial with Mordovia Saransk, managed by his former Gabala manager Yuri Semin, signing a two-year contract on 26 June 2014. After just one season with Mordovia Saransk, Niasse left the club by mutual consent in June 2015.

After six months without a club, Niasse signed a six-month contract with Concordia Chiajna in January 2016.

After being released by Concordia China, Niasse signed with Indian Super League side Delhi Dynamos on 10 September 2016.

On 26 January 2017, Niasse signed a season and half contract with Levadiakos.

On 31 October 2019, Niasse returned to Gabala, signing a contract until the end of the 2019–20 season.

On 28 January 2020, Niasse returns to Greek Super League with Lamia.

Personal life
His brother Oumar Niasse is also a professional footballer.

Career statistics

Club

Honours
Raja CA
CAF Confederation Cup: 2018
CAF Super Cup: 2019
Ionikos
Super League Greece 2: 2020–21

References

External links

1988 births
Living people
Association football defenders
Association football midfielders
Senegalese footballers
AS Nancy Lorraine players
Neuchâtel Xamax FCS players
Gabala FC players
Raja CA players
FC Mordovia Saransk players
CS Concordia Chiajna players
Levadiakos F.C. players
Kozani F.C. players
Swiss Super League players
Azerbaijan Premier League players
Russian Premier League players
Liga I players
Super League Greece players
Senegalese expatriate footballers
Expatriate footballers in France
Expatriate footballers in Switzerland
Expatriate footballers in Azerbaijan
Expatriate footballers in Russia
Expatriate footballers in Romania
Expatriate footballers in Greece